Life of Crime is the second studio album by American garage rock band Laughing Hyenas, released in September 1990 by Touch and Go Records. It was reissued in 1992 accompanied with You Can't Pray a Lie.

Track listing

Personnel
Adapted from the Life of Crime liner notes.

Laughing Hyenas
John Brannon – vocals
Jim Kimball – drums
Kevin Strickland – bass guitar
Larissa Strickland – guitar

Production and additional personnel
Laughing Hyenas – production
Butch Vig – production
Bill Widener – front cover illustration

Release history

References

External links 
 

1990 albums
Laughing Hyenas albums
Touch and Go Records albums
Albums produced by Butch Vig